The Dagenham East rail crash was a railway accident on the London, Tilbury and Southend line of British Railways which occurred at Dagenham, United Kingdom.

The accident took place at around 19:34 on 30 January 1958 and was a rear-end collision involving two late-running trains. Conditions at Dagenham East station were foggy at the time. The accident occurred after one train had passed a signal at danger due to a driver error in the thick fog. Ten passengers were killed in the accident and 89 injured. Four members of railway staff were also injured.

The trains involved were the LMS 2-6-4 tank engine hauled 18:20 Fenchurch Street to Shoeburyness and the BR standard 2-6-4 tank hauled 18:35 Fenchurch Street to Thorpe Bay. Each train consisted of 11 coaches with approximately 500 passengers. The 18:35 train ploughed into the back of the 18:20 departure which demolished three carriages and derailed several others. The locomotive of the 18:35 train and leading carriage were derailed. Some wreckage blocked the adjacent London Underground line but did not cause any further accidents.

One of the locomotives involved in this accident (80079) survives today at the Severn Valley Railway.

References

External links
Major Incidents Emergency Planning College (Excel). Retrieved 7 June 2006
Report of the Collision (PDF). Retrieved 7 June 2006
British Pathe – "Dagenham. Another Fog Disaster"

Railway accidents and incidents in London
Transport in the London Borough of Barking and Dagenham
Railway accidents and incidents in Essex
Railway accidents in 1958
1958 disasters in the United Kingdom
1958 in England
1958 in London
Railway accidents involving fog
London, Tilbury and Southend Railway
Railway accidents involving a signal passed at danger
Dagenham
Accidents and incidents involving British Rail
January 1958 events in the United Kingdom
Train collisions in England
Rail accidents caused by a driver's error